The F. F. Odenweller-James P. and Nettie Morey House is a historic building located in Des Moines, Iowa, United States.  It is a 1½-story frame cottage that follows an irregular plan. It features chamfered corners, Stick Style strips, moulded lintels, beaded corner boards, decorative shinglework, and a small front porch with a shed roof.  The property on which it stands is one of ten plats that were owned by Drake University. The University sold the lot to Delos Cutler, one of the University Land Company organizers, in 1887. The next year he sold the property to F.F. Odenweller.  After seven years the property was sold to A.A. Smith and O.E. Bowers.  In 1896, the year the house was built, the property was sold to J.P. Morey, and he owned it for twenty-three years.  Its significance is attributed to the effect of the University's innovative financing techniques upon the settlement of the area around the campus. The house was listed on the National Register of Historic Places in 1988.

References 

Houses completed in 1896
Victorian architecture in Iowa
Houses in Des Moines, Iowa
National Register of Historic Places in Des Moines, Iowa
Houses on the National Register of Historic Places in Iowa